The 2022–23 Iraq Division Two will be the 49th season of the Iraq Division Two, and it is the third tier in the Iraqi football league system since its establishment in 1974. The number of clubs in the league have varied throughout history for various reasons; in this season the number of clubs will be 98 (in addition to 26 pre-qualified teams from the previous season, playing starting from the second round, so the total is 125 teams). The top two teams in the Final Qualifiers are promoted directly to the Iraq Division One, while the teams that fail to qualify for the second round will be relegated directly to the Iraq Division Three. The season is scheduled to start on 1 December 2022.

Team changes 
The following teams have changed division since the 2021–22 season:

To Iraq Division Two 

 Promoted from Division Three 
 Abnaa Al-Madina
 Al-Amir
 Al-Aziziyah
 Al-Chibayish
 Al-Dair
 Al-Falluja
 Al-Garmah
 Al-Ghadeer
 Al-Gharraf
 Al-Hadbaa
 Al-Hashd Al-Shaabi
 Al-Intifadha
 Al-Ishaqi
 Al-Iskan
 Al-Izza
 Al-Jawhara
 Al-Mahanawiya
 Al-Mahawil
 Al-Maqal
 Al-Osra
 Al-Shabab Al-Basri
 Al-Shaheed Arkan
 Al-Siyaha
 Al-Tijara
 Al-Wajihiya
 Al-Zaytoun
 Al-Zubaidiya
 Aliyat Al-Shorta
 Anah
 Habbaniya Al-Sumoud
 Jenaain Babil
 Kafaat Nineveh
 Masafi Al-Shamal
 Naft Al-Shamal
 Qandeel
 Taza

 Relegated from the Division One 
 Al-Alam
 Babil
 Ghaz Al-Shamal
 Suq Al-Shuyukh

From Iraq Division Two 

 Promoted to the Division One 
 Al-Etisalat
 Al-Hawija
 Al-Jolan
 Masafi Al-Wasat

 Relegated to Division Three 
 Al-Ahrar
 Al-Amara
 Al-Anbar
 Al-Hamza
 Al-Husseiniyah
 Al-Khairat 
 Al-Fosfat
 Al-Madhatyia 
 Al-Mohandessin
 Al-Sadda
 Al-Taliea 
 Al-Zaeem 
 Baladiyat Al-Nasiriyah 
 Bilad Al-Rafidain 
 Daquq 
 Ghaz Al-Janoob
 Jalawla 
 Kahrabaa Al-Hartha
 Khallat 
 New Sirwan
 Peshwa 
 Salahaddin
 Sarchinar 
 Shabab Al-Adil 
 Tarmi
 Umm Qasr

Competition format

Schedule 
The Iraq Division Two starts with 98 clubs and ends with two qualified clubs according to three rounds, The teams that qualified for the second round last season and the teams that were relegated from the Iraq Division One in the 2021–22 season moved directly to play in the second round.

First round 
The 98 clubs are divided into 16 groups depending on the location, except for the groups of Dohuk and Erbil, each group representing the governorate to which these clubs belong and is located within its borders.

1- Dohuk Group
There are no teams in Dohuk that play in this division.

2- Nineveh Group

3- Erbil Group
There are no teams in Erbil that play in this division.

4- Kirkuk Group

5- Sulaymaniyah Group

6- Saladin Group

7- Al-Anbar Group

8- Baghdad Groups

Group 1

Group 2

9- Diyala Group

10- Karbalaa Group

11- Babil Group

12- Wasit Groups

Group 1

Group 2

13- Al-Najaf Group

14- Al-Qādisiyyah Group

15- Maysan Group

16- Al-Muthanna Group

17- Dhi Qar Group

18- Basra Group

Qualified teams
The 26 pre-qualified teams and the 25 teams coming from the first round are all divided into five groups by location. From each group, the first and second teams qualify directly to the final stage.

Second round 
The draw for the Central Euphrates Group and Southern Group regions was held on February 21, 2023, while the Northern Group draw was held in February 25, 2023.

Northern section

Group 1

Group 2

Group 3

Western section

Group 1

Group 2

Baghdad section
TBD

Central Euphrates section

Group 1

Group 2

Southern section

Group 1

Group 2

Group 3

Third round
TBA

Final
TBA

References

External links
 Iraq Football Association

2022–23 in Iraqi football
Football leagues in Iraq
Third level football leagues in Asia